Manuel Cuni (born September 16, 1983), known professionally as Immanuel Casto, is an Italian singer-songwriter and activist.
Since November 1, 2019, Manuel is also the president of the organization Mensa Italia.

Biography

1983–2008: Early works 
Born in Alzano Lombardo, Manuel Cuni moved to Bologna in 2002, to work as an art director. Between 2003 and 2004, with the stage name Immanuel, Cuni produced and released the EPs On the Road, Voyeur and Vento di erezioni. The songs showed an ironic take on sex and pornography, in a dance/electronic style. According to Casto, his work belongs in the porn groove music genre. In 2005, the song "Io la do" got to be broadcast nationally on Radio Deejay.

The 2008 music video for "Anal Beat" was Casto's big break. He became a regular guest on MTV Italia's Loveline and got to be featured on El País. In the same year Casto signed with Jle Management. In June Casto performed at the National Gay Pride and published his first greatest hits The Hits.

2009–2014: Adult Music and Freak & Chic 
In 2009 Casto went on his first national tour and released the single "Touché (Par l'amour)", his first song available on digital stores and produced by his future main collaborator, Keen.

In 2010 he began his collaboration with singer-songwriter Romina Falconi, releasing "Crash", one of Casto's most successful singles, later included in his first studio album, Adult Music (Universal 2011).

On September 13, 2013, Immanuel Casto published his second studio album Freak & Chic, which included the singles "Tropicanal" and "Sexual Navigator" (featuring the drag queen Minerva Lowenthal). Romina Falconi is featured on the third single, "Sognando Cracovia", which became the title for Casto and Falconi's joint tour in 2014–2015. In turn, Casto appeared on the song "Eyeliner", included in Falconi's album Certi sogni si fanno attraverso un filo d'odio.

2015–2018: The Pink Album and L'età del consenso 
In 2015 Casto released "Deepthroat Revolution" and announced his third studio work, The Pink Album, published on September 25. With "Rosico" Casto begins his collaboration with Tying Tiffany, while "Rosso oro e nero" is a cover of Einstürzende Neubauten's "Sabrina", performed with Italian post punk band Soviet Soviet, and "Horror Vacui" features once again Romina Falconi. The video for "Alphabet of Love", featuring adult performer Franco Trentalance, has been officially released in September 2016 on Pornhub. According to a statement released by Casto's production company, it is the first time a European artist gets to release their video on the site.

On September 14, 2018, Casto released the greatest hits L'età del consenso. The lead single, "Piromane", featuring Romina Falconi, was released on June 5, 2018.

2019–present: Malcostume 
On November 1, 2019, Casto became president of the organization Mensa Italia.

On June 18, 2021, Casto released the single "Dick Pic", a ballad about the annoying habit, widespread in the gay community but not only, of sending unsolicited images of genitals, in chat or on social networks. On December 3, 2021, Casto released the single "Piena", in collaboration with the group Karma B.

In 2022 Casto edited the graphics of the book Rottocalco by Romina Falconi. On June 10, 2022, Casto released his fourth studio album, Malcostume, preceded by the single "Wasabi Shock".

Controversies 
 In 2012 Casto released Squillo (lit. "call girl"), a collectible card game about prostitution, sex trafficking and various criminal activities. On October 9, 2012, senator Emanuela Baio Dossi, urged for the game to be removed from stores due to its controversial and offensive content.
 The song "Da grande sarai fr**io" (lit. "When you grow up you'll be a f*ggot"), from The Pink Album, sparked some controversy upon its release, in spite of carrying an "it gets better" message aimed at LGBT youth. However, due to Casto's trademark explicit and politically incorrect style and his use of slurs, it was deemed offensive by part of his LGBT audience, prompting Casto, himself an out gay man and LGBT activist, to make a video addressing his fans and explaining the meaning of the song.
 In 2016 Casto released a satirical board game called Witch & Bitch; the politician Mario Adinolfi threatened to report Casto and the co-creator of Witch & Bitch Marco Albiero because he recognized himself in the illustration of the card "Omofobo" (lit. "homophobic").

Discography

Albums
2011 – Adult Music
2013 – Freak & Chic
2015 – The Pink Album
2022 – Malcostume

Compilations
2011 – Porn Groove 2004/2009
2018 – L'età del consenso

Singles
2009 – "Touché (Par l'amour)"
2010 – "Escort 25"
2010 – "Crash" (feat. Romina Falconi)
2011 – "Revival"
2011 – "Killer Star"
2012 – "Zero carboidrati"
2012 – "Porn to Be Alive"
2012 – "A pecorina nel presepe"
2013 – "Tropicanal"
2014 – "Sexual Navigator"
2014 – "Sognando Cracovia" (feat. Romina Falconi)
2015 – "Deepthroat Revolution"
2015 – "Da grande sarai fr**io"
2015 – "DiscoDildo"
2016 – "Alphabet of Love"
2018 – "Piromane" (feat. Romina Falconi)
2021 – "Dick Pic"
2021 – "Piena" (feat. Karma B)
2022 – "Wasabi Shock"

Comics 
 Squillo – The Comic n. 0, Freak & Chic, Ariccia, Magic Press, 2014 (drawn by di Matt Core) 
 Squillo – The Comic Vol. 1, Freak & Chic, Ariccia, Magic Press, 2016 (drawn by Matt Core) 
 Morte Bianca (foreword), Verona, Poliniani, 2021 (story by Mortebianca, drawn by Marco Albiero) ,

Further reading 

 Max Ribaric, Tutti su di me. Immanuel Casto raccontato da Max Ribaric, Milan, Tsunami Edizioni, 2015

References

External links
 Sito ufficiale
 

Italian male singer-songwriters
1983 births
Living people
21st-century Italian male singers
Italian gay musicians
Italian LGBT singers
Italian LGBT songwriters
Gay singers
Gay songwriters
People from Alzano Lombardo
20th-century Italian LGBT people
21st-century Italian LGBT people